This is a list of Belgian football transfers for the 2019 summer transfer window. Only transfers involving a team from the professional divisions are listed, including the 16 teams in the Belgian First Division A and the 8 teams playing in the Belgian First Division B.

The summer transfer window will open on 1 July 2019, although several transfers will be announced prior to that date. Players without a club may join one at any time, either during or in between transfer windows. The transfer window ends on 2 September 2019, although a few completed transfers could still be announced a few days later.

Sorted by date

January 2019

February 2019

March 2019

April 2019

May 2019

June 2019

End of 2018–19 season
After the end of the 2018–19 season, several players will return from loan to another club or will not have their contracts extended. These will be listed here when the date is otherwise not specified.

July 2019

August 2019

September 2019

Sorted by team

Belgian First Division A teams

Anderlecht

In:

Out:

Antwerp

In:

Out:

Cercle Brugge

In:

Out:

Charleroi

In:

 

Out:

Club Brugge

In:

Out:

Eupen

In:

Out:

Excel Mouscron

In:

  
  

  

  

Out:

Genk

In:

Out:

Gent

In:

Out:

Kortrijk

In:

Out:

Mechelen

In:

Out:

Oostende

In:

Out:

Sint-Truiden

In:

Out:

Standard Liège

In:

Out:

Waasland-Beveren

In:

Out:

Zulte-Waregem

In:

Out:

Belgian First Division B teams

Beerschot

In:

Out:

Lokeren

In:

Out:

Lommel

In:

Out:

OH Leuven

In:

Out:

Roeselare

In:

Out:

Union SG

In:

Out:

Virton

In:

Out:

Westerlo

In:

Out:

Footnotes

References

Belgian
Transfers Summer
2019 Summer